Assumption College San Lorenzo (AC, Assumption SanLo, Assumption Makati), is a private, Roman Catholic basic and higher education institution exclusively for girls run by the Religious of the Assumption in San Lorenzo Village, Makati, Philippines. It was established by the Assumption Sisters in 1958 and named Assumption Convent. Assumption San Lorenzo is the successor of the closed school named Assumption Convent which was located along Herran Street, Ermita, Manila. 

It provides education from pre-school, elementary, secondary, tertiary, to graduate level. The alumnae and present students of this school include daughters and granddaughters of Presidents, industrialists, politicians, actors/actresses and prominent figures in the Philippines.

Assumption College is a charter member of the Philippine Accrediting Association of Schools, Colleges and Universities (PAASCU). It has earned Level IV accreditation on all of its respective departments and schools. The school is a member of Strategic Educational Alliance of Southeast Asia.

History

Early history
Sister Marie Eugénie Milleret de Brou (later canonised as Saint Marie-Eugénie de Jésus; 1817–1898) established the Congregation of the Religious of the Assumption in Paris on 30 April 1839 as a means to make a Christian transformation of society through education. The order arrived in Spanish colonial Philippines in 1892, and at the request of Queen María Cristina, consort of King Alfonso XII of Spain, they established the Superior Normal School for Women Teachers in Intramuros in 1892 which pioneered women education in the Philippines. Among its first alumnae were Rosa Sevilla de Alvero, Foundress of the Instituto de Mujeres; Librada Avelino and Carmen de Luna, who founded Centro Escolar University. At the outbreak of the Philippine Revolution of 1896, the order ceased operation of the school and returned to Europe.

Herran-Dakota campus
At the request of Pope Pius X, a group of anglophone Assumption Sisters returned to Manila in 1904; the Philippine Islands were by then already under American control. With the group of Sisters were Mother Helen Margaret as Superior, and Mother Rosa María Pachoud, Mother Esperanza Maria A. CuUnjieng, Madame Angela Ansaldo, Sr. Lory Mapa, Sr. Luisa Locsin and Sr. Bianca Rosa Perez Rubio who subsequently spent most of her religious life in the Religious of the Assumption in Asia. Originally an elementary and secondary school, the college was added in 1940. Its successors are Assumption College San Lorenzo and Assumption Antipolo.

Formerly found in the genteel enclave of Ermita, the school very much resembled the renowned girls’ schools of France and the rest of Europe, becoming a favorite amongst Manila's pre-War élite. It was considered a school for the alta de sociedad (high society) and there was no other value more emphasized than the French term noblesse oblige: “To whom much is given, much will be required.” The school was once at the corner of Calle Herran and Calle Dakota (now known as Pedro Gil and Adriatico, respectively), beside the old Padre Faura campus of the all-boys' Ateneo de Manila, where the brothers of Assumptionistas often studied. It was from this time when the so-called “Ateneo-Assumption” families sprung up, with entire clans exclusively attending either school. It offered subjects such as Spanish, French, language and reading in English, arithmetic, and religion, as well as manners and penmanship.

During the Second World War, the whole school and the rest of the city were destroyed by heavy aerial bombardment in the 1945 Liberation of Manila. As with many schools, Assumption College resumed classes in quonset huts and in a battered auditorium in the ruins of the Herran campus. Mother Superior Rosa María and Madame Esperanza Maria A. CuUnjieng brought the school back to its feet and relaunched it in 1947 when the Reconstruction began, reopening in 1948. The Herran campus officially closed its doors in 1973. The former Assumption Herran campus and the adjacent Padre Faura campus of Ateneo were sold and today Robinsons Place Manila currently occupy these former academic campuses. .

Architecture and culture
A vast and stately school with manicured gardens, lush plants and numerous trees, the Assumption Convent had school buildings in the neo-Gothic style which had high-ceilings and arcades. Possessing a very French, feminine aura, the convent school sported arched windows and corridors, partly hidden floral medallions, (specifically the fleur-de-lys common to the other French girls' school, Saint Paul University Manila), and even a lagoon with boats.

The Herran Assumption also featured one of the most impressive school chapels in Manila. Neo-Gothic in design, the chapel featured arched, stained-glass windows and a comparatively small Gothic main altar. Students of the Herran campus still observed older practises of the Catholic Church, with students made to genuflect upon entering any place where the Blessed Sacrament was kept. In those days, students also signed for fifteen-minute shifts for the adoration of the Blessed Sacrament and they were excused from class while doing the Adoration. In the afternoons, the students with lacy white mantillas on their heads, filled the chapel for common adoration, ending the day with singing the Tantum Ergo.

There were also the very distinct things done within the walls of the school that through the decades would have the virtual label of "Assumption". There were the Assumption tarts (triangular tarts topped with guava jelly), and the Assumption siomai, beloved by students because of how it tasted like those made by Ma Mon Luk, a famous noodle shop. There was also Assumption cottage pie, ground meat topped with mashed potatoes served at the refectory. Students wore the distinct Assumption uniform of a tartan skirt (the fabric of which was first imported from France), sailor-collared shirts and a pin with a gold-coloured school seal. The lace-filled immaculately white uniforms called "gala dress" were reserved for more formal occasions such as Mass and Graduation Rites. Visiting guests had to contend themselves of speaking with the students in a parlour.

Students played a ball game they called bataille and were taught to curtsy before nuns, specifically the Mother Superior whom they were taught to address as "Notre Mère" ("our mother"). A lasting hallmark of an "Old Girl" is the school's conspicuous penmanship known as "Assumption Script". Letters are distinctly long with sharp elongated points, it is a precise cursive, with flourished majuscules and jagged tails. It was a source of pride, according to Gonzalez, and a way of immediately identifying an Herran Assumptionista.

Herran closure and San Lorenzo-Antipolo transfers
The school then expanded to its San Lorenzo, Makati campus, welcoming 180 students into its preparatory and elementary levels in June 1958. The following year, Assumption College San Lorenzo opened its doors to college-bound young women, and the college moved there in 1959.

After some time, the Herran campus was sold as the area was becoming a commercial and tourist center, not conducive to learning. In 1972–73, four San Lorenzo campus teachers were transferred to pave the way for merging elementary schools and secondary schools of Herran and San Lorenzo. In 1973–74, the Herran and San Lorenzo schools fused: the High School and the college were based in San Lorenzo while the Preschool and Grade School briefly occupied Herran, temporarily moving to San Lorenzo in June 1974.

The Grade School finally resettled in Assumption Antipolo along Sumulong Highway on 11 September 1974, with the Preschool staying in San Lorenzo. However, the distance between Antipolo and Manila became a problem, driving alumnae and parents to petition the college to re-open the elementary level in San Lorenzo. Grade 1 was re-opened in 1981 and starting school year 1988–89, grade levels were added until the San Lorenzo Grade School's first batch of seventh Grade students graduated in March 1993.

Response to the Church
In line with the spirit of Vatican II, and in response to the call of the Church in the Second Plenary Council of the Philippines and the needs of the country, the Assumption in the Philippines has refocused their ministries towards the rural areas and the underprivileged sector, but without abandoning the education of the upper/middle classes.

Academic institution

Basic Education Division
Pre-school and Kinder: The Preschool program of the Assumption gives a premium to character formation and instills in students a love for learning and a beginning sense of social responsibility.
Gradeschool (Grade 1 to Grade 6): In the Grade School program, a well-rounded curriculum is delivered using brain-based instructional strategies. Students acquire knowledge and skills in real-life contexts, particularly through Project-Based Learning, Singapore Math, Science, and Social Studies inquiry activities, and design tasks. They learn about mindfulness, reflection, and prayer to build the foundations of a strong relationship with God. They are also given regular opportunities to interact with different sectors of society through Concrete Acts for Social Transformation (C.A.S.T).
Junior High School (Grade 7 to Grade 10): The Junior High School program forms students of character who excel academically, exhibit a growing sense of social responsibility, and enjoy a personal relationship with God. As in Grade School, learning continues to occur in real-life contexts with Project-Based Learning, inquiry activities and investigations, and design tasks. Enrichment programs in Math, Science, Writing, and Filipinos are offered, and students are given opportunities for collaboration and leadership.
Senior High School (Grade 11 to Grade 12): The Senior High School program is anchored on the goal of “Christianization of the intelligence” so as to form women servant-leaders who love their times and work for the transformation of society. The curriculum aims to instill a love for learning and passion for undertaking research by providing real-life, relevant, interdisciplinary, and student-centered opportunities to develop Prime Life Abilities. Students engage in a variety of authentic projects and activities such as the Research Congress, Science Innovation, Business Implementation, and Arts Curation and Production, Work Immersion, Inter-Faith Youth Camp and Model ASEAN Summit in order to prepare them for college/university and the workplace.  
Assumption College Senior High School offers four strands: Accounting, Business & Management (ABM), Arts & Design (A&D), Humanities and Social Sciences (HUMSS) and Science, Technology, Engineering and Mathematics (STEM).

Graduates from the AC-HS move on to pursue higher education at the following colleges in the Philippines such as De La Salle University, University of the Philippines, University of Santo Tomas, Ateneo de Manila University, and De La Salle-College of Saint Benilde and also abroad.

The Marie-Eugénie School of Innovative Learning (MESIL)
 Bachelor of Science in Interior Design
 Bachelor of Arts in Psychology
 Bachelor of Science in Psychology
 Bachelor of Science in Elementary Education Major in Early Childhood Education
 Bachelor of Secondary Education Major in English
 Bachelor of Communication major in:
 Media Production
 Advertising
 Performing Arts
 Digital Content and Management

Milleret School of Business and Management for Women (MSBMW)
Bachelor of Science in Business Administration major in Corporate Business
 Bachelor of Science in Business Administration major in International Business
 Bachelor of Science in Entrepreneurship
 Bachelor of Science in Entrepreneurship with Specialization in Tourism Management
 Bachelor of Science in Business Administration major in Marketing Management
 Bachelor of Science in Business Administration major in Human Resources Management
 Bachelor of Science in Accountancy
 Bachelor of Science in Management Accounting

Academic linkages
The college is part of the Women's Consortium of Colleges which includes St. Scholastica's College Manila in Malate, La Consolacion College Manila in Mendiola, College of the Holy Spirit Manila in Mendiola. St. Paul University Quezon City, and Miriam College in Katipunan, Quezon City.

Notable alumnae
Corazón Aquino (1933–2009) – eleventh President of the Philippines (1986–1992), figurehead of the 1986 People Power Revolution. Studied for a year before enrolling at the affiliated Ravenhill Academy in the United States.
Gloria Macapagal Arroyo – fourteenth President of the Philippines (2001–2009), former Vice-President of the Philippines, Senator, Social Welfare Secretary, and Undersecretary for Trade
Victoria Syquia Quirino, Victoria Quirino-Delgado – former first lady; her father's official hostess in Malacañang. She was a senior high- school student at Assumption Convent when she moved to the palace.
Loren Legarda – Senator, former broadcast journalist and actress
Grace Poe-Llamanzares – Senator, daughter of actors Fernando Poe, Jr. and Susan Roces; former Chairwoman of the Movie and Television Review and Classification Board 
Gina de Venecia – Congresswoman of the 4th district of Pangasinan; wife of former senator José de Venecia, Jr.
Imee Marcos – Senator of the Philippines; daughter of the tenth President of the Philippines Ferdinand Marcos and First Lady Imelda Marcos; elder sister of seventeenth President of the Philippines Bongbong Marcos
Gina Lopez (1953-2019) – late Secretary of Environment and Natural Resources and a member of the prominent López family of Iloilo
Teresa Aquino-Oreta –  former senator; sister of assassinated opposition Senator Benigno Aquino Jr. and sister-in-law of Corazon Aquino (see above) 
Jamby Madrigal – politician and former senator 
Isabel Preysler – Madrid-based socialite, formerly of Manila; first wife of Julio Iglesias and mother of singer Enrique Iglesias 
Celia Diaz-Laurel – thespian, painter, writer, poet
Bambi Harper – cultural writer and socialite; former president of the Heritage Conservation Society of the Philippines; columnist for the Philippine Daily Inquirer
Fides Cuyugan-Asensio – soprano; Professor Emeritus at the University of the Philippines Voice and Music Theater/Dance Department 
Cherie Mercado - Former TV5 newscaster, former DOTr spokesperson
Boots Anson-Roa – award-winning actress, columnist, editor, and lecturer
Cory Quirino - television host, author, beauty pageant titleholder, and granddaughter of Philippine President Elpidio Quirino
Paraluman  (1923–2009) – a FAMAS-award-winning Filipino actress
Joey Albert – singer
Emmylous Gaite (also known as Nicole Hyala) – radio jock at Love Radio in the Philippines, graduated cum laude at Assumption
Marilou Díaz-Abaya (1955–2012)  – award-winning director
Toni Rose Gayda – television presenter and celebrity
Ella del Rosario - multi-Platinum recording artist, radio/TV show host and movie actress, triple Aliw awardee and multi-awarded KBP music icon who revolutionized Filipino music with her country-popular Manila Sound recording hits  
Vicki Belo – dermatologist and celebrity
Leah Navarro – actress, singer, executive director of The Black & White Movement
Mickey Ferriols – actress
Maricel Laxa – actress
Christine Bersola-Babao –  broadcast journalist, actress, radio-television personality
Gang Badoy – founder of RockEd Philippines, radio and television host, feature writer, TOWNS (The Outstanding Women in the Nation's Service) and TOYM (Ten Outstanding Young Men) awardee
Georgina Wilson – model; celebrity
Isabelle Daza – celebrity; model
Ako Kamo – model and beauty pageant titleholder who won Miss Universe Japan 2019
Bianca Manalo – celebrity, actress, model, and beauty pageant holder (Miss Universe Philippines 2009), graduated with a course of Bachelor of Communication major in Advertising and Public Relations
Leanne Mamonong and Naara Acueza (Leanne & Naara) – indie pop duo

References

External links
 

Universities and colleges in Makati
Girls' schools in the Philippines
Women's universities and colleges in the Philippines
Catholic elementary schools in Metro Manila
Catholic secondary schools in Metro Manila
Catholic universities and colleges in Metro Manila
Association of Christian Universities and Colleges in Asia
Assumptionist education